Emraan Anwar Hashmi (born 24 March 1979) is an Indian actor and singer who appears predominantly in Hindi cinema. Hashmi debuted in 2003 with the crime thriller film Footpath and subsequently appeared in films include Murder (2004), Kalyug (2005), Gangster (2006) and gained acclaim starring in the action film Awarapan (2007). Hashmi has received several Filmfare Awards nominations.

Before venturing into acting, Hashmi worked as an assistant director for the horror film Raaz (2002). During the same decade, he became a huge sensational and established leading actor with many successful romantic thrillers like Zeher (2005), Aashiq Banaya Aapne (2005), Aksar (2006) and Gangster (2006). His other critically and commercially successful films include Jannat (2008), Raaz: The Mystery Continues (2009), Once Upon a Time in Mumbaai (2010), The Dirty Picture (2011), Murder 2 (2011), Shanghai (2012), Jannat 2 (2012), Raaz 3 (2012) and Ek Thi Daayan (2013).

Early life 
Hashmi was born on 24 March 1979, in Mumbai, Maharashtra into a Muslim family. His father, Syed Anwar Hashmi, is a businessman, who also acted in the 1968 film Baharon Ki Manzil, and his mother, Maherrah Hashmi, was a homemaker. His paternal grandfather, Syed Shauqat Hashmi, migrated to Pakistan after the partition of India, while his grandmother, Meherbano Mohammad Ali (known by her screen name Purnima), was an actress, who stayed in India. Meherbano Mohammad Ali later married producer-director Bhagwan Das Varma, making Bhagwan Das Emraan’s step grandfather and Emraan a part of the Varma family. Emraan is also a part of the Bhatt family because Meherbano was the sister of Shirin Mohammad Ali, the mother of producers Mahesh Bhatt and Mukesh Bhatt, who are thus Hashmi's uncles. Hashmi is the cousin of director Mohit Suri, with whom he has collaborated in several films. His other cousins are actresses Pooja Bhatt and Alia Bhatt, while another cousin is actor Rahul Bhatt. Hashmi studied at the Jamnabai Narsee School. After graduating from Jamnabai, he attended Sydenham College in Mumbai. Hashmi later earned a bachelor's degree from the University of Mumbai.

Career

2003–2007: Debut and breakthrough 
Hashmi made his acting debut in 2003, with Vikram Bhatt's thriller Footpath. Co-starring alongside Aftab Shivdasani and Bipasha Basu, he portrayed the role of Raghu Shrivastav, a gangster. His performance in the film was appreciated by critics; Gaurav Malani described him as the "scene-stealer" and praised his mannerisms. The following year he featured in Anurag Basu's erotic thriller Murder with Mallika Sherawat and Ashmit Patel. Taran Adarsh of Bollywood Hungama said about his performance: "Emraan Hashmi is fantastic in a role that seems tailor made for him. Enacting the role of an obsessive lover with flourish, there's no denying that the narrative gets a major impetus thanks to Emraan's performance."

Hashmi next starred in Anurag Basu's romance, Tumsa Nahin Dekha, opposite Dia Mirza. While shooting the film, Basu was diagnosed with blood cancer, so producer-director Mahesh Bhatt completed it. Although the film did not succeed at the box office, his portrayal of Daksh Mittal (a young millionaire who falls in love with a bargirl) was generally well received. A review of his performance in BBC Online noted that he was "becoming fabulous with every film."
Hashmi then took a supporting role in Mohit Suri's thriller Kalyug, alongside Kunal Khemu, Smilie Suri, Amrita Singh, Ashutosh Rana and Deepal Shaw. Based on the sex industry, the film depicted the devastating effect that non-consensual pornographic films have on the subjects. Hashmi featured as Ali Bhai, a man who runs a sex shop. His performance garnered positive reviews from critics, with Taran Adarsh writing: "Emraan Hashmi makes a brief appearance and the actor is, like always, highly competent." Kalyug was a moderate success in India.

Hashmi's first film in 2006 was Anant Mahadevan's thriller Aksar with Udita Goswani and Dino Morea. The film was a profitable production, but met with negative reviews from critics. He next appeared in Anurag Basu's romantic thriller Gangster, co-starring Kangana Ranaut and Shiney Ahuja. Hashmi received positive reviews for his portrayal of an undercover detective called Aakash; Rediff.com's Raja Sen wrote, "His character is an understated one, and Hashmi manages to keep it that way. There is no unnecessary bluster or melodrama, and he does a pretty believable job. There is something lazy about his acting, by which I mean he makes the job look easy." For the film, Hashmi received his first Filmfare nomination for Best Performance in a Negative Role. He then acted in the crime thriller The Killer (adapted from the 2004 film Collateral) and the romance Dil Diya Hai. Both these films failed critically and commercially.

In 2007, Hashmi appeared in three films. He first starred in the comedy Good Boy Bad Boy alongside Tusshar Kapoor, Isha Sharvani and Tanushree Dutta. The film flopped at the box office and received unfavourable reviews. He then featured opposite Mrinalini Sharma and Shriya Saran in Mohit Suri's romantic thriller Awarapan. Hashmi was cast as the protagonist Shivam, a gangster with a tragic past. Writing for the Hindustan Times, critic Khalid Mohamed described it as "intense and believable". Subhash K Jha wrote: "... Emraan Hashmi [is] an actor who conceals more than he reveals on screen. There is an inherent pain in his personality that this film taps better than anything he has done earlier. This film marks the emergence of a major talent." His final release of the year was the thriller The Train, which also underperformed. Only Awarapan was both a commercial and critical success becoming the best film of his career.

2008–2012: Commercial success and stardom 
His only film in 2008 was Kunal Deshmukh's Jannat, a love story set against the backdrop of match fixing. Co-starring alongside Sonal Chauhan, Javed Sheikh and Sameer Kochhar, Hashmi was cast as Arjun Dixit, a bookmaker. His performance was appreciated by critics; Taran Adarsh commented that "[t]he actor displays the gamut of emotions with aplomb, he changes expressions like a chameleon changes colors. Jannat is yet another turning point in his career."

In 2009, Hashmi appeared in Mohit Suri's supernatural horror Raaz – The Mystery Continues, alongside Kangana Ranaut and Adhyayan Suman. The film's domestic collection exceeded , and emerged as a success. Hashmi's portrayal of a painter attracted favourable reviews; The Times of India'''s Nikhat Kazmi wrote: "Emraan Hashmi is fast emerging as the Colin Farrell of Indian cinema: completely mercurial, eclectic and unpredictable. As the brooding, prescient painter, who paints death on his canvas and falls in love with one of subjects, he is suitably aggrieved, desperate and afraid." He then starred opposite Soha Ali Khan in Kunal Deshmukh's Tum Mile, a love story set against the backdrop of the 2005 Maharashtra floods. The film performed poorly at the box office.

The following year, Hashmi featured in Milan Luthria's period action-drama Once Upon a Time in Mumbaai with an ensemble cast including Ajay Devgan, Randeep Hooda, Kangana Ranaut and Prachi Desai. The picture, which depicted the rise of organised crime in Mumbai, saw Hashmi play Shoaib Khan, a character inspired by real-life gangster Dawood Ibrahim. For his performance, Hashmi earned positive reviews from critics and received a Best Supporting Actor nomination at the 56th Filmfare Awards. Blessy Chettiar of Daily News and Analysis described him as "top class". Komal Nahta remarked: "This is easily Emraan's best performance so far. If he is cute in the romantic scenes, he is believably tough in the action and dramatic scenes." His next release was Mohit Suri's action-thriller Crook, based on the violence against Indians in Australia controversy. However, the film performed poorly and was panned by critics.

In 2011, Hashmi first appeared in Madhur Bhandarkar's romantic comedy Dil Toh Baccha Hai Ji, alongside Ajay Devgan, Omi Vaidya, Shazahn Padamsee, Tisca Chopra and Shruti Hassan. The film underperformed and received mixed reviews from critics, as did Hashmi's performance. He next featured in Mohit Suri's slasher thriller Murder 2, alongside Jacqueline Fernandez, Prashant Narayanan and Sulagna Panigrahi. The film, as well as his performance generated mixed reviews from critics. Shubhra Gupta of The Indian Express wrote: "Hashmi gets to do what he does best, glowering at the men, bedding the ladies, and towards the end, going head to head with the bad guy [...] he goes through the film with his usual smart one-liners containing equal amounts of bluster and fluster."

Hashmi's final film in 2011 was Milan Luthria's biopic The Dirty Picture, featuring Vidya Balan as the controversial Indian actress Silk Smitha, alongside Naseeruddin Shah and Tusshar Kapoor. He was cast as Abraham, the narrator, who proclaims himself to be the protagonist's biggest enemy. The film opened to critical acclaim and Hashmi's performance was appreciated; CNN-IBN's Rajeev Masand wrote: "Emraan Hashmi is appropriately restrained as Abraham, a director who believes in film as art, and who abhors the idea of inserting steamy numbers in his movie to lure in the crowds." However, several critics were sceptical about his role in the film; Soumyadipta Banerjee from Daily News and Analysis considered it "out of place".

In 2012, Hashmi appeared in Kunal Deshmukh's crime thriller Jannat 2 with Randeep Hooda and Esha Gupta. It was initially titled "Informer", but was later changed to the current title, making it a follow-up film to Jannat (2008). The film generated mixed reviews from critics, though it was a success at the box office. He then starred alongside Abhay Deol, Prosenjit Chatterjee and Kalki Koechlin in Dibakar Banerjee's Shanghai, an adaptation of writer Vassilis Vassilikos's novel Z and the 1969 French film of the same name. Set in a fictional town called Bharat Nagar, the political thriller traced corruption in India. The film opened to critical acclaim, and Hashmi received unanimous praise for his portrayal of Joginder Parmar, a videographer who sometimes shoots porn films. Madhureeta Mukherjee of The Times of India wrote that Hashmi "looks the part and pulls off an act he should be proud of." Raja Sen described it as one of his best performances and wrote: "Emraan Hashmi, delivers a knockout punch as he masters a complicated role" and called it as "the year's finest, bravest and most consistent performance." He received his second Best Supporting Actor nomination at the 58th Filmfare Awards for his performance.

Hashmi's next appearance was for Vikram Bhatt's supernatural horror Raaz 3D, alongside Bipasha Basu and Esha Gupta. Though a commercial success, the film and his performance received mostly negative reviews; critic Kunal Guha commented: "[Hashmi] takes his role as seriously as he could but his efforts couldn't exorcise the devilishly terrible plot from spelling doom for this film." Lisa Tsering of The Hollywood Reporter wrote: "The swarthy Hashmi [...] does a forgettable job. His final film of the year was Shamin Desai's delayed thriller Rush, which failed at the box office.

 2013–present: Commercial setbacks and further projects 
In 2013, Hashmi was first seen in Ekta Kapoor and Vishal Bhardwaj's supernatural thriller Ek Thi Daayan, alongside Konkona Sen Sharma, Huma Qureshi and Kalki Koechlin. Critical opinion on the film was mostly positive, and Hashmi's performance also drew appreciation. Saibal Chatterjee of NDTV mentioned that Hashmi "gives the character of the haunted magician just that – a haunted feel that is just apt," whilst Shubhra Gupta called his performance "consistent", adding that he "is a performer who keeps getting better".

Hashmi's second appearance was for Raj Kumar Gupta's comic-thriller Ghanchakkar, opposite Vidya Balan. Critics were divided in their judgment of the film, as well as Hashmi's performance. Sneha May Francis of Emirates 24/7 wrote that "Emraan Hashmi spins one of his acting career's most understated, yet imposing performances. He crafts [his character's] predicaments – his anger, frustration and suspicions – with effortless charm." Rajeev Masand was more critical of his performance, reflecting that he "struggles to shine under the limited scope of his role." At the box office, both Ek Thi Daayan and Ghanchakkar underperformed. In 2014, Hashmi firstly starred in Kunal Deshmukh's Raja Natwarlal and Rensil D'Silva's Ungli, both of which flopped at the box office, with the latter being Hashmi's 5th consecutive failure at the box office. He played the leading role in Academy Award winning director Danis Tanović's Tigers, which premiered at 2014 Toronto International Film Festival and was later released digitally on the on-demand platform ZEE5 in November 2018.

In 2015, Hashmi appeared in two films. Mr. X was a disaster at the box office, along with negative reviews, the other being the long-awaited Hamari Adhuri Kahani, opposite Vidya Balan for the third time. It was commercially average despite getting mixed reviews by critics, although it received positive reactions from the audience.Boxoffice . Boxofficeindia.com (12 June 2015). Retrieved on 18 September 2015.

His next film Azhar was released on 13 May 2016 to mixed reviews. He then appeared in Vikram Bhatt's Raaz: Reboot, which is the fourth film in the Raaz film series and was released on 16 September 2016. Raaz Reboot was an average grosser at the box office. His next movie Baadshaho, directed by Milan Luthria, in which he co-starred alongside Ajay Devgan, Ileana D'Cruz, Esha Gupta and Vidyut Jammwal, was released on 1 September 2017. He began shooting for Captain Nawab in late 2017 but it was reported in early 2018 that it was kept on hold. As of October 2018, Hasmi then appeared in Bard of Blood, a web-television series based on the namesake book by Bilal Siddiqui. Produced by Shah Rukh Khan, the web-series was released on Netflix. In January 2019, he starred in Soumik Sen's crime drama Why Cheat India, another box-office flop. 

In February 2021, Emraan Hashmi was featured in romantic song 'Lut Gaye'. Presented by T-Series, directed by Radhika Rao and Vinay Sapru. Sung by Jubin Nautiyal.

In 2021, his three films; Mumbai Saga, a crime thriller by Sanjay Gupta alongside John Abraham, Chehre alongside Amitabh Bachchan, in which he is playing a business tycoon Karan Oberai, and horror flick Dybbuk, which is a remake of Malayalam horror thriller Ezra , with Nikita Dutta, were released in 19 March 27 August, and 29 October respectively.In 2022, Emraan featured in a music video "Ishq Nahi Karte" by B Praak and Jaani.

After no movie releases in 2022, he returned to screens in February 2023 starring as a RTO Inspector in Selfiee, a remake of Malayalam language movie titled Driving Licence. The movie which also starred Akshay Kumar as his parallel lead was a declared a disaster at the box office with majorly receiving negative to mixed reviews. Emraan is set to appear as the antagonist in YRF's Tiger 3, which will see him in a negative role pitted against Salman Khan's Tiger. The movie is a part of the YRF Spy Universe. 

 Personal life 

Hashmi married Parveen Shahani in an Islamic wedding ceremony in December 2006 after a six and a half-year relationship. The couple have a son, Ayaan Hashmi, who was born on 3 February 2010. On 15 January 2014, Ayaan was diagnosed with first-stage cancer. Five years later, in 2019 January, Ayaan Hashmi was declared cancer free. He is a cousin of Bollywood actress Alia Bhatt and his sister in law is Udita Goswami.

While Hashmi's father is Muslim and his mother was Christian, Hashmi was brought up as a Muslim and says he is a "firm believer in God". His mother, Maherrah Hashmi, died on 11 March 2016, Hashmi cancelled one day shoot of his film Azhar, when he got to know about his mother's demise. He did not want to delay the shoot of Azhar'' any further and also wanted to occupy his mind with work. So, he returned to the sets the soonest he could. In 2016, Hashmi launched the auto-biographical book called "The Kiss of Life", which was based on his son's journey of cancer.

Filmography

Accolades

See also 
 List of Indian film actors

References

External links 

 
 Emraan Hashm on Bollywood Hungama

1979 births
Indian male film actors
Gujarati Muslims
Male actors from Mumbai
Male actors in Hindi cinema
Living people
University of Mumbai alumni
21st-century Indian male actors